The OAMPS Queensland Scorchers are an Australian women's field hockey team based in Queensland that play in the Australian Hockey League. In the 2014 season, they were the runners-up to the NSW Arrows. They also won the 2013 Australian Hockey League Premiership, as well as the 2015 AHL Premiership.
In 2016 they made it back-to-back premierships, beating Victoria in the final. When they again met Victoria in the 2017 final, the two teams were level at full time. The match then went to shoot outs, with Victoria coming away with the championship.

Current roster
The following is the Queensland Scorchers team roster for the 2017 AHL:

Head coach: Lee Bodimeade

Savannah Fitzpatrick
Madison Fitzpatrick
Ashlea Fey
Ambrosia Malone
Kirstin Dwyer
Jordyn Holzberger
Madeline James
Tegan Richards
Stephanie Kershaw
Rebecca Greiner
Morgan Gallagher
Hannah Astbury (GK)
Clare Comerford (GK)
Jamie Stone
Britt Noffke
Kazzia Lammon
Britt Wilkinson
Renee Taylor

References

External links
Hockey Queensland - Queensland Scorchers

Field hockey clubs established in 1993
1993 establishments in Australia
Sc
Australian field hockey clubs
Women's field hockey teams in Australia
Sporting clubs in Brisbane